Tai Wo is a MTR station in the western part of Tai Po New Town, in New Territories, Hong Kong.

History 
Construction of the station, situated within the eponymous Tai Wo Estate, began in August 1986. It opened on 9 May 1989 as an intermediate station of the East Rail line, then known as the Kowloon–Canton Railway, upon the completion of the estate.

Layout 
The Tai Wo station premises are sandwiched between the two wings of Tai Wo Plaza, the shopping mall of Tai Wo Estate. Both of the exits at the station connect to Tai Wo Plaza, and passengers must pass through the mall in order to enter or exit the station.

Entrances/exits 
A: Tai Wo Plaza, transport interchange
B: Tai Wo Estate

Connections 
Below Tai Wo station is a transport interchange, where bus and minibus routes connecting the neighbouring rural areas of Lam Tsuen, Tai Hang and Kau Lung Hang are available. This render Tai Wo the gateway to the western rural part of Tai Po District.

References 

MTR stations in the New Territories
East Rail line
Former Kowloon–Canton Railway stations
1989 establishments in Hong Kong
Railway stations in Hong Kong opened in 1989